Alex Valentini (born 5 April 1988) is an Italian footballer who plays as a goalkeeper for  club Pro Vercelli.

Career

Mantova
Primary a youth team player, he was assigned number 88 shirt of the first team in 2006–07 Serie B season. He was loaned to Sambonifacese and won the promotion playoffs of 2007–08 Serie D. The club then signed him in co-ownership deal. In June 2009, he was bought back from the San Bonifacio based club. Since returned to Mantova, he was selected to Italy under-21 Serie B representative team twice, for internal friendlies, both as white team keeper against the blue team. In January 2010, he was loaned to Pro Sesto.

Pro Vercelli
After Mantova went bankrupt, he was signed by Pro Belvedere Vercelli (and later merged with Pro Vercelli to become F.C. Pro Vercelli 1892) He was the first choice of the team, ahead Marzio Dan who was the first choice for PB Vercelli in the last season.

Spezia
Valentini joined Spezia in August 2013 in a co-ownership deal. In June 2014 Spezia signed Valentini outright, with Danilo Russo moved to opposite direction.

After Spezia acquired Valentini outright, he left the club on loan for two seasons.

In summer 2017 Valentini finally left the club permanently.

Vicenza
On 27 July 2017 Valentini joined Vicenza on a two-year contract.

Triestina
After being released by Vicenza, on 26 June 2018 he joined Triestina.

On 30 January 2019, he joined Viterbese on loan.

On 4 July 2019, he moved on loan to Alessandria.

Pro Verselli
On  22 October 2021, he returned to Pro Verselli as a free agent.

References

External links
 Football.it Profile 
 La Gazzetta dello Sport Profile 
 

1988 births
Living people
Sportspeople from the Province of Reggio Emilia
Footballers from Emilia-Romagna
Italian footballers
Association football goalkeepers
Serie B players
Serie C players
Mantova 1911 players
S.S.D. Pro Sesto players
F.C. Pro Vercelli 1892 players
Spezia Calcio players
A.S. Cittadella players
L.R. Vicenza players
U.S. Triestina Calcio 1918 players
U.S. Viterbese 1908 players
U.S. Alessandria Calcio 1912 players
Swiss Super League players
FC Lugano players
Italian expatriate footballers
Italian expatriate sportspeople in Switzerland
Expatriate footballers in Switzerland